Natanael Batista Pimenta (born 25 December 1990), simply known as Natanael, is a Brazilian footballer who plays as a left back for Internacional.

Club career

Early career
Born in Cuiabá, Mato Grosso, Natanael made his senior debuts with Operário de Várzea Grande in 2009. In 2011, he joined hometown's Cuiabá, after a short stint at  de Tangará.

Atlético Paranaense
On 19 December 2013, after his contract with Cuiabá expired, Natanael signed a one-year deal with Série A club Atlético Paranaense. He made his debut in the competition on 20 April, starting in a 1–0 home win against Grêmio. On 3 July 2014, Natanael signed a new three-year deal with Furacão. He finished the campaign with 31 appearances (all starts), also appearing regularly during the year's Copa Libertadores.

On 22 March 2015, Natanael scored his first goal for Atlético Paranaense in a 7–0 home win over Nacional in the Campeonato Paranaense.

Ludogorets Razgrad
In July 2015, Natanael signed for Bulgarian champions PFC Ludogorets Razgrad for an undisclosed fee. On 8 August, he played 55 minutes for Ludogorets II in a B Group match against Vereya. Natanael made his first-team debut on 16 August, playing the full 90 minutes as Ludogorets beat Lokomotiv Plovdiv 1–0 at Ludogorets Arena. The Brazilian quickly established himself as a first choice in the main squad, helping Ludogorets to win their fifth championship in the 2015–16 season. Natanael then played in all 6 qualifying matches of the 2016–17 UEFA Champions League, with his team managing to enter the group stage of the tournament. On 28 September 2016, he opened the scoring in the home match against Paris Saint-Germain in the group stage, netting from a free kick, but the Razgrad team went on to concede three goals and lost the match.

Statistics

Honours
Ludogorets Razgrad
 Bulgarian First League (4): 2015–16, 2016–17, 2017–18, 2018–19
 Bulgarian Supercup: 2018

References

External links
Atlético Paranaense profile 

1990 births
Living people
Brazilian footballers
Association football defenders
Campeonato Brasileiro Série A players
Campeonato Brasileiro Série C players
Campeonato Brasileiro Série D players
First Professional Football League (Bulgaria) players
Second Professional Football League (Bulgaria) players
Operário Futebol Clube (Várzea Grande) players
Cuiabá Esporte Clube players
Club Athletico Paranaense players
PFC Ludogorets Razgrad players
Sport Club Internacional players
Atlético Clube Goianiense players
Avaí FC players
Brazilian expatriate footballers
Expatriate footballers in Bulgaria
People from Cuiabá
Sportspeople from Mato Grosso